This is a list of foreign ministers in 2006.

Africa
 Algeria - Mohammed Bedjaoui (2005-2007)
 Angola - João Bernardo de Miranda (1999-2008)
 Benin -
 Rogatien Biaou (2003-2006)
 Frédéric Dohou, (acting) (2006)
 Mariam Aladji Boni Diallo (2006-2007)
 Botswana - Mompati Merafhe (1994-2008)
 Burkina Faso - Youssouf Ouédraogo (1999-2007)
 Burundi - Antoinette Batumubwira (2005-2009)
 Cameroon -
 Laurent Esso (2004-2006)
 Jean-Marie Atangana Mebara (2006-2007)
 Cape Verde - Víctor Borges (2004-2008)
 Central African Republic - 
 Jean-Paul Ngoupandé (2005-2006)
 Côme Zoumara (2006-2008)
 Chad - Ahmad Allam-Mi (2005-2008)
 Comoros -
 Aboudou Soefou (2005-2006)
 Ahmed Ben Said Jaffar (2006-2010)
 Republic of Congo - Rodolphe Adada (1997-2007)
 Democratic Republic of Congo - Raymond Ramazani Baya (2004-2007)
 Côte d'Ivoire -
Bamba Mamadou (2003-2006)
Youssouf Bakayoko (2006-2010)
 Djibouti - Mahamoud Ali Youssouf (2005–present)
 Egypt - Ahmed Aboul Gheit (2004-2011)
 Equatorial Guinea - Pastor Micha Ondó Bile (2003-2012)
 Eritrea - Mohamed Omer (acting) (2005-2007)
 Ethiopia - Seyoum Mesfin (1991-2010)
 Gabon - Jean Ping (1999-2008)
 The Gambia -
 Lamin Kaba Bajo (2005-2006)
 Bala Garba Jahumpa (2006-2007)
 Ghana - Nana Akufo-Addo (2003-2007)
 Guinea -
 Fatoumata Kaba (2005-2006)
 Mamady Condé (2006-2007)
 Guinea-Bissau - António Isaac Monteiro (2005-2007)
 Kenya - Raphael Tuju (2005-2008)
 Lesotho - Monyane Moleleki (2004-2007)
 Liberia -
 Thomas Nimely (2003-2006)
 George Wallace (2006-2007)
 Libya - Abdel Rahman Shalgham (2000-2009)
 Madagascar - Marcel Ranjeva (2002-2009)
 Malawi -
 Davis Katsonga (2005-2006)
 Joyce Banda (2006-2009)
 Mali -  Moctar Ouane (2004-2011)
 Mauritania - Ahmed Ould Sid'Ahmed (2005-2007)
 Mauritius - Madan Dulloo (2005-2008)
 Morocco - Mohamed Benaissa (1999-2007)
 Western Sahara - Mohamed Salem Ould Salek (1998–2023)
 Mozambique - Alcinda Abreu (2005-2008)
 Namibia - Marco Hausiku (2004-2010)
 Niger - Aïchatou Mindaoudou (2001-2010)
 Nigeria -
 Oluyemi Adeniji (2003-2006)
 Ngozi Okonjo-Iweala (2006)
 Joy Ogwu (2006-2007)
 Rwanda - Charles Murigande (2002-2008)
 São Tomé and Príncipe -
 Ovídio Manuel Barbosa Pequeno (2004-2006)
 Óscar Sousa (2006)
 Carlos Gustavo dos Anjos (2006-2007)
 Senegal - Cheikh Tidiane Gadio (2000-2009)
 Seychelles - Patrick Pillay (2005-2009)
 Sierra Leone - Momodu Koroma (2002-2007)
 Somalia -
 Abdullahi Sheikh Ismail (2004-2006)
 Ismail Mahmud Hurre (2006-2007)
 Somaliland -
 Edna Adan Ismail (2003-2006)
 Abdillahi Mohamed Duale (2006-2010)
 South Africa - Nkosazana Dlamini-Zuma (1999-2009)
 Sudan - Lam Akol (2005-2007)
 Swaziland -
 Mabili Dlamini (2003-2006)
 Moses Mathendele Dlamini (2006-2008)
 Tanzania -
Jakaya Kikwete (1995-2006)
Asha-Rose Migiro (2006-2007)
 Togo - Zarifou Ayéva (2005-2007)
 Tunisia - Abdelwahab Abdallah (2005-2010)
 Uganda - Sam Kutesa (2005–2021)
 Zambia -
 Ronnie Shikapwasha (2005-2006)
 Mundia Sikatana (2006-2007)
 Zimbabwe - Simbarashe Mumbengegwi (2005–2017)

Asia
 Afghanistan -
 Abdullah Abdullah (2001-2006)
 Rangin Dadfar Spanta (2006-2010)
 Armenia - Vartan Oskanian (1998-2008)
 Azerbaijan - Elmar Mammadyarov (2004–2020)
 Nagorno-Karabakh - Georgy Petrosyan (2005-2011)
 Bahrain - Sheikh Khalid ibn Ahmad Al Khalifah (2005–2020)
 Bangladesh -
 Morshed Khan (2001-2006)
 Iajuddin Ahmed (2006-2007)
 Bhutan - Khandu Wangchuk (2003-2007)
 Brunei - Pengiran Muda Mohamed Bolkiah (1984–2015)
 Cambodia - Hor Namhong (1998–2016)
 China - Li Zhaoxing (2003-2007)
 East Timor -
 José Ramos-Horta (2000-2006)
 José Luís Guterres (2006-2007)
 Georgia - Gela Bezhuashvili (2005-2008)
 Abkhazia - Sergei Shamba (2004-2010)
 South Ossetia - Murat Dzhioyev (1998-2012)
 India -
 Manmohan Singh (2005-2006)
 Pranab Mukherjee (2006-2009)
 Indonesia - Hassan Wirajuda (2001-2009)
 Iran - Manouchehr Mottaki (2005-2010)
 Iraq - Hoshyar Zebari (2003–2014)
 Kurdistan - Falah Mustafa Bakir (2006–2019)
 Israel -
 Silvan Shalom (2003-2006)
 Tzipi Livni (2006-2009)
 Palestinian Authority -
 Nasser al-Qudwa (2005-2006)
 Mahmoud al-Zahar (2006-2007)
 Japan - Taro Aso (2005-2007)
 Jordan - Abdul Ilah Khatib (2005-2007)
 Kazakhstan - Kassym-Jomart Tokayev (2002-2007)
 North Korea - Paek Nam-sun (1998-2007)
 South Korea -
 Ban Ki-moon (2004-2006)
 Song Min-soon (2006-2008)
 Kuwait - Sheikh Mohammad Sabah Al-Salem Al-Sabah (2003-2011)
 Kyrgyzstan - Alikbek Jekshenkulov (2005-2007)
 Laos -
 Somsavat Lengsavad (1993-2006)
 Thongloun Sisoulith (2006–2016)
 Lebanon -
 Fawzi Salloukh (2005-2009)
 Tarek Mitri (acting) (2006-2008)
 Malaysia - Syed Hamid Albar (1999-2008)
 Maldives - Ahmed Shaheed (2005-2007)
 Mongolia -
 Tsendiin Mönkh-Orgil (2004-2006)
 Nyamaa Enkhbold (2006-2007)
 Myanmar - Nyan Win (2004-2011)
 Nepal -
 Ramesh Nath Pandey (2005-2006)
 Khadga Prasad Oli (2006-2007)
 Oman - Yusuf bin Alawi bin Abdullah (1982–2020)
 Pakistan - Khurshid Mahmud Kasuri (2002-2007)
 Philippines - Alberto Romulo (2004-2011)
 Qatar - Sheikh Hamad bin Jassim bin Jaber Al Thani (1992-2013)
 Saudi Arabia - Prince Saud bin Faisal bin Abdulaziz Al Saud (1975–2015)
 Singapore - George Yeo (2004-2011)
 Sri Lanka - Mangala Samaraweera (2005-2007)
 Syria -
Farouk al-Sharaa (1984-2006)
Walid Muallem (2006–2020)
 Taiwan -
Mark Chen (2004-2006)
James C. F. Huang (2006-2008)
 Tajikistan -
 Talbak Nazarov (1994-2006)
 Khamrokhon Zaripov (2006-2013)
 Thailand -
Kantathi Suphamongkhon (2005-2006)
Nitya Pibulsonggram (2006-2008)
 Turkmenistan - Raşit Meredow (2001–present)
 United Arab Emirates -
 Rashid Abdullah Al Nuaimi (1980-2006)
 Sheikh Abdullah bin Zayed Al Nahyan (2006–present)
 Uzbekistan -
 Elyor Ganiyev (2005-2006)
 Vladimir Norov (2006-2010)
 Vietnam -
 Nguyễn Dy Niên (2000-2006)
 Phạm Gia Khiêm (2006-2011)
 Yemen - Abu Bakr al-Qirbi (2001-2014)

Europe
 Albania - Besnik Mustafaj (2005-2007)
 Andorra - Juli Minoves Triquell (2001-2007)
 Austria - Ursula Plassnik (2004-2008)
 Belarus - Sergei Martynov (2003-2012)
 Belgium - Karel De Gucht (2004-2009)
 Brussels-Capital Region - Guy Vanhengel (2000-2009)
 Flanders - Geert Bourgeois (2004-2008)
 Wallonia - Marie-Dominique Simonet (2004-2009)
 Bosnia and Herzegovina - Mladen Ivanić (2003-2007)
 Bulgaria - Ivailo Kalfin (2005-2009)
 Croatia - Kolinda Grabar-Kitarović (2005-2008)
 Cyprus -
Georgios Iacovou (2003-2006)
Giorgos Lillikas (2006-2007)
 Northern Cyprus -
 Serdar Denktaş (2004-2006)
 Turgay Avcı (2006-2009)
 Czech Republic -
Cyril Svoboda (2002-2006)
Alexandr Vondra (2006-2007)
 Denmark - Per Stig Møller (2001-2010)
 Greenland - Josef Motzfeldt (2003-2007)
 Estonia - Urmas Paet (2005–2014)
 Finland - Erkki Tuomioja (2000-2007)
 France - Philippe Douste-Blazy (2005-2007)
 Germany - Frank-Walter Steinmeier (2005-2009)
 Greece -
Petros Molyviatis (2004-2006)
Dora Bakoyannis (2006-2009)
 Hungary -
Ferenc Somogyi (2004-2006)
Kinga Göncz (2006-2009)
 Iceland -
Geir Haarde (2005-2006)
Valgerður Sverrisdóttir (2006-2007)
 Ireland - Dermot Ahern (2004-2008)
 Italy -
 Gianfranco Fini (2004-2006)
 Massimo D'Alema (2006-2008)
 Latvia - Artis Pabriks (2004-2007)
 Liechtenstein - Rita Kieber-Beck (2005-2009)
 Lithuania -
Antanas Valionis (2000-2006)
Petras Vaitiekūnas (2006-2008)
 Luxembourg - Jean Asselborn (2004–present)
 Macedonia -
Ilinka Mitreva (2002-2006)
Antonio Milošoski (2006-2011)
 Malta - Michael Frendo (2004-2008)
 Moldova - Andrei Stratan (2004-2009)
 Transnistria - Valeriy Litskai (2000-2008)
 Monaco -
Rainier Imperti (2005-2006)
Henri Fissore (2006-2007)
 Montenegro -
Miodrag Vlahović (2004-2006)
Milan Roćen (2006-2012)
 Netherlands - Ben Bot (2003-2007)
 Norway - Jonas Gahr Støre (2005-2012)
 Poland -
Stefan Meller (2005-2006)
Anna Fotyga (2006-2007)
 Portugal -
Diogo de Freitas do Amaral (2005-2006)
Luís Amado (2006-2011)
 Romania - Mihai-Răzvan Ungureanu (2004-2007)
 Russia - Sergey Lavrov (2004–present)
 San Marino -
Fabio Berardi (2003-2006)
Fiorenzo Stolfi (2006-2008)
 Serbia - Vuk Drašković (2006-2007)
 Serbia and Montenegro - Vuk Drašković (2004-2006)
 Montenegro - Miodrag Vlahović (2004-2006)
 Slovakia -
Eduard Kukan (1998-2006)
Ján Kubiš (2006-2009)
 Slovenia - Dimitrij Rupel (2004-2008)
 Spain - Miguel Ángel Moratinos (2004-2010)
 Sweden -
Laila Freivalds (2003-2006)
Bosse Ringholm (acting) (2006)
Carin Jämtin (acting) (2006)
Jan Eliasson (2006)
Carl Bildt (2006–2014)
 Switzerland - Micheline Calmy-Rey (2003-2011)
 Turkey - Abdullah Gül (2003-2007)
 Ukraine - Borys Tarasyuk (2005-2007)
 United Kingdom -
Jack Straw (2001-2006)
Margaret Beckett (2006-2007)
 Vatican City -
 Archbishop Giovanni Lajolo (2003-2006)
 Archbishop Dominique Mamberti (2006–2014)

North America and the Caribbean
 Antigua and Barbuda - Baldwin Spencer (2005–2014)
 The Bahamas - Fred Mitchell (2002-2007)
 Barbados - Dame Billie Miller (1994-2008)
 Belize -
 Godfrey Smith (2003-2006)
 Eamon Courtenay (2006-2007)
 Canada -
Pierre Pettigrew (2004-2006)
Peter MacKay (2006-2007)
 Quebec - Monique Gagnon-Tremblay (2003-2008)
 Costa Rica -
Roberto Tovar Faja (2002-2006)
Bruno Stagno Ugarte (2006-2010)
 Cuba - Felipe Pérez Roque (1999-2009)
 Dominica - Charles Savarin (2005-2007)
 Dominican Republic - Carlos Morales Troncoso (2004–2014)
 El Salvador - Francisco Laínez (2004-2008)
 Grenada - Elvin Nimrod (2000-2008)
 Guatemala -
Jorge Briz Abularach (2004-2006)
Gert Rosenthal (2006-2008)
 Haiti -
Hérard Abraham (2005-2006)
Jean Rénald Clérismé (2006-2008)
 Honduras -
Mario Fortín (2005-2006)
Milton Jiménez (2006-2008)
 Jamaica -
Keith Desmond Knight (2001-2006)
Anthony Hylton (2006-2007)
 Mexico -
Luis Ernesto Derbez (2003-2006)
Patricia Espinosa (2006-2012)
 Netherlands Antilles -
Etienne Ys (2004-2006)
Emily de Jongh-Elhage (2006-2010)
 Nicaragua - Norman José Caldera Cardenal (2002-2007)
 Panama - Samuel Lewis Navarro (2004-2009)
 Puerto Rico – Fernando Bonilla (2005–2009)
 Saint Kitts and Nevis - Timothy Harris (2001-2008)
 Saint Lucia -
 Petrus Compton (2004-2006)
 Rufus Bousquet (2006-2007)
 Saint Vincent and the Grenadines - Sir Louis Straker (2005-2010)
 Trinidad and Tobago -
Knowlson Gift (2001-2006)
Arnold Piggott (2006-2007)
 United States - Condoleezza Rice (2005-2009)

Oceania
 Australia - Alexander Downer (1996-2007)
 Fiji -
 Kaliopate Tavola (2000-2006)
 Isikeli Mataitoga (acting) (2006-2007)
 French Polynesia -
 Oscar Temaru (2005-2006)
 Gaston Tong Sang (2006-2007)
 Kiribati - Anote Tong (2003–2016)
 Marshall Islands - Gerald Zackios (2001-2008)
 Micronesia - Sebastian Anefal (2003-2007)
 Nauru - David Adeang (2004-2007)
 New Zealand - Winston Peters (2005-2008)
 Cook Islands - Wilkie Rasmussen (2005-2009)
 Niue - Young Vivian (2002-2008)
 Palau - Temmy Shmull (2001-2009)
 Papua New Guinea -
 Sir Rabbie Namaliu (2002-2006)
 Sir Michael Somare (2006)
 Paul Tiensten (2006-2007)
 Samoa - Tuilaepa Aiono Sailele Malielegaoi (1998–2021)
 Solomon Islands -
 Laurie Chan (2002-2006)
 Patteson Oti (2006-2007)
 Tonga - Sonatane Tu'a Taumoepeau Tupou (2004-2009)
 Tuvalu -
 Maatia Toafa (2004-2006)
 Apisai Ielemia (2006-2010)
 Vanuatu - Sato Kilman (2004-2007)

South America
 Argentina - Jorge Taiana (2005-2010)
 Bolivia -
Armando Loaiza (2005-2006)
David Choquehuanca (2006–2017)
 Brazil - Celso Amorim (2003-2011)
 Chile -
Ignacio Walker Prieto (2004-2006)
Alejandro Foxley (2006-2009)
 Colombia -
Carolina Barco (2002-2006)
María Consuelo Araújo (2006-2007)
 Ecuador - Francisco Carrión (2005-2007)
 Guyana - Rudy Insanally (2001-2008)
 Paraguay -
Leila Rachid de Cowles (2003-2006)
Rubén Ramírez Lezcano (2006-2008)
 Peru -
Óscar Maúrtua de Romaña (2005-2006)
José Antonio García Belaúnde (2006-2011)
 Suriname - Lygia Kraag-Keteldijk (2005-2010)
 Uruguay - Reinaldo Gargano (2005-2008)
 Venezuela -
Alí Rodríguez Araque (2004-2006)
Nicolás Maduro (2006-2013)

References
http://rulers.org

2006 in international relations
Foreign ministers
2006